Mukota is a breed of indigenous, domestic pig found primarily in Zimbabwe. It is also known as the Rhodesian Indigenous or Zimbabwe Indigenous pig. 

Mukota pigs are black, hardy in the tropics, resistant to disease and poor nutrition, and require little water (6 liters per week). They fall into two broad classes. One is short and fat, with a short snout resembling that of the Chinese Lard pig. The other resembles the Windsnyer (Wind cutter), with long snout and razorback.

Mukotas are found primarily in Zimbabwe (with an estimated 70,000 pigs), but also in Mozambique and Zambia. They are believed to have been introduced in the 17th century Europe and China trade (Bonsma and Joubert, 1952), and are named after the Mukota region of northeastern Zimbabwe, where they were first studied in detail.

Reproduction follows an annual rhythm with peak farrowing in the early rainy season (October/November). Age at first litter ranges from 6 to 12 months, with mean litter size between 6.5 and 7.5. Carcass yield is about 30% less than from the exotic Large White pig, but is considered tasty and "sweet".

These indigenous Zimbabwean pigs show moderate parasite tolerance, greater than the imported or western varieties. Zimbabwe's indigenous Mukota pigs are known to be less prone than imported varieties to internal parasites within commercial agriculture. A study evaluating parasite prevalence, by veterinarians from South Africa's Fort Hare University and the University of Zimbabwe, found moderate parasite infection in pigs from ten communal regions in Zimbabwe's Chirumhanzu district. (Sub-Saharan Africa gateway, Science and Development Network website)

References 
 Bonsma, F.N. and D.M. Joubert, Fmg. S. Afr. 27: 167–170. 1952.
 Holness, D.H., The tropical agriculturalist - PIGS, CTA/Macmillan, London, 1995. pp 16–48.
 Mason, I.L., A World Dictionary of Livestock Breeds, Types and Varieties, Fourth Edition. C.A.B International, 1996. 273 pp.
 Oklahoma State University
 Indigenous Zimbabwean pigs show 'moderate' parasite tolerance

Pig breeds originating in Zimbabwe